Mucilaginibacter soli is a Gram-negative, facultatively anaerobic, rod-shaped and non-motile bacterium from the genus of Mucilaginibacter which has been isolated from soil from the Arctic tundra near Ny-Ålesund in Norway.

References

External links
Type strain of Mucilaginibacter soli at BacDive -  the Bacterial Diversity Metadatabase

Sphingobacteriia
Bacteria described in 2012